What My Heart Already Knows is the debut album by Canadian country music artist Julian Austin. It was released by ViK. Recordings on May 6, 1997. The album peaked at number 9 on the RPM Country Albums chart and was certified gold by Music Canada.

Track listing
"Little Ol' Kisses" (Julian Austin) – 2:28
"Hard Time Loving You" (Austin) – 4:17
"Two Out of Three Ain't Bad" (Jim Steinman) – 4:20
"Honky Tonk Lock and Key" (Austin, Stephen Robichaud) – 3:08
"Sad Ways of a Fool" (Austin) – 2:16
"What My Heart Already Knows" (Austin, Robichaud) – 3:44
"Diamond" (Austin, Robichaud) – 3:36
"Sister Ruby" (Austin, Robichaud) – 3:26
"Dancing with Him" (Austin, Robichaud) – 3:22
"Highway Song" (Austin) – 3:13
"When You're Gone" (Austin, Robichaud) – 2:20
"Leaving You Was Never Right" (Austin) – 4:43

Chart performance

Certifications

References

External links
[ What My Heart Already Knows] at Allmusic

1997 debut albums
Julian Austin (musician) albums